The Alberta Electoral Boundary Re-distribution, 2010 was a re-distribution of the boundaries of 87 Alberta electoral districts which elect a single member to the Legislative Assembly of Alberta.

The Electoral Boundaries Commission Act requires the Legislative Assembly to create a Electoral Boundaries Commission to review and provide recommendations for provincial representation in Alberta. The Current electoral laws in Alberta fix the number of seats in the Legislative Assembly of Alberta at 87.

The 2009/2010 Alberta Electoral Boundaries Commission was established on July 31, 2009, and was chaired by Justice J. M. Walter and members included Keith Archer, Peter Dobbie, Brian Evans and Allyson Jeffs. The Final Report by the commission with recommendations was submitted to the legislature on June 24, 2010. The recommendations of the Commission were accepted and the electoral division boundaries were implemented by Bill 28, Electoral Divisions Act.:

List of electoral districts

See also
Alberta Electoral Boundary Re-distribution, 2004

References

Further reading

2010 in Canadian politics
Electoral Boundary Re-distribution 2010
Electoral redistributions in Canada
Alberta Legislature
2010 in Alberta